Olallo Rubio is a Mexican filmmaker and broadcaster.  He is known for his documentaries So, What's Your Price?,  Gimme the Power and Ilusión Nacional, and the feature film This Is Not a Movie

Career 

Rubio's career began in radio at XHDL-FM.  His first film, So, What's Your Price?, a documentary film critical of consumerism, premiered at the 2007 Guadalajara International Film Festival.  His next film, This Is Not a Movie, stars Edward Furlong as a man who grapples with existential questions during the end of the world.  It premiered at the Morelia International Film Festival in 2010 and had a budget of $3 million.  Gimme the Power, released just before the 2012 Mexican general election, is a rockumentary about the Mexican band Molotov that is also critical of Mexican politics.  His latest film, released in 2014 just prior to the 2014 FIFA World Cup, is Ilusión Nacional, a documentary about football in Mexico.

Filmography 
 So, What's Your Price? (2007)
 This Is Not a Movie (2010)
 Gimme the Power (2012)
 Ilusión Nacional (2014)

References

External links 
 

Living people
Mexican documentary filmmakers
Mexican film producers
Mexican radio presenters
Mexican screenwriters
Year of birth missing (living people)